Castagneto may refer to:

Places in Italy
Municipalities (comuni)
Castagneto Carducci, in the Province of Livorno 
Castagneto Po, in the Metropolitan City of Turin

Civil parishes (frazioni)
Castagneto, in the municipality of Cava de' Tirreni, Province of Salerno
Castagneto, in the municipality of Teramo

Personalities
 Donna Marella Caracciolo di Castagneto (b. 1927), Italian-American designer
 Don Carlo Caracciolo di Castagneto (1925-2008), Italian editor